Doriana Rivera Aliaga (born 18 June 1977) is a retired Peruvian badminton player who later represented New Zealand in her career. She is the two time bronze medalist at the Pan American Games in Women's doubles category. Besides this, she has also represented her country in World Championships.

Doriana Rivera completed her Bachelor in Medicine in the yeae 2004 after which she moved to New Zealand to start her career. She worked in a hospital for 3 years where she gained experience in various aspects of medicine. Dr. Rivera started her journey as a General Practitioner in 2012, and was granted Fellowship of the Royal New Zealand College of General Practitioners in 2015. She was appointed as the Deputy Medical Director for a busy GP and Urgent Care clinic where she worked for 7 years.

Achievements

Pan American Games
Women's doubles

Pan American Championships 
Women's doubles

South American Championships 
Women's singles

Women's doubles

Mixed doubles

IBF/BWF International 
Women's singles

Women's doubles

Mixed doubles

References

External links 
 
 

1977 births
Living people
Peruvian female badminton players
New Zealand female badminton players
New Zealand general practitioners
Pan American Games bronze medalists for Peru
Pan American Games medalists in badminton
Badminton players at the 1999 Pan American Games
Badminton players at the 2003 Pan American Games
Medalists at the 1999 Pan American Games
Medalists at the 2003 Pan American Games
21st-century Peruvian women
21st-century New Zealand women